Fallencourt is a commune in the Seine-Maritime department in the Normandy region in northern France.

Geography
The A28 autoroute passes through the commune's territory.

Population

Places of interest
 Remains of a moated feudal motte.
 The church, dating from the sixteenth century.

See also
Communes of the Seine-Maritime department

References

Communes of Seine-Maritime